Michele Nardi (born 9 July 1986) is an Italian football player. He plays as a goalkeeper for  club Fermana.

Club career
He began his senior career as an 18 year old when he joined (then in Serie B) Santarcangelo in 2005. He soon made his Debut in Serie B. In 2014 though, Santarcangelo were demoted to Serie C, thus, he made his Serie C debut for Santarcangelo on 30 August 2014 in a game against Lucchese. He was transferred to Parma in 2017 where he made only 1 appearance before being loaned out to Siena.

On 24 January 2019 he moved on loan to Südtirol.

On 2 September 2019, he signed with Chievo.

On 30 September 2020, he joined his hometown club Cesena in Serie C on a one-season contract.

On 24 August 2022, Nardi joined Fermana.

References

External links
 

1986 births
Living people
People from Cesena
Footballers from Emilia-Romagna
Italian footballers
Association football goalkeepers
Serie B players
Serie C players
Serie D players
Santarcangelo Calcio players
Parma Calcio 1913 players
A.C.N. Siena 1904 players
F.C. Südtirol players
A.C. ChievoVerona players
Cesena F.C. players
Fermana F.C. players
Sportspeople from the Province of Forlì-Cesena